Rhembastus is a genus of leaf beetles in the subfamily Eumolpinae, native to Africa. Whilst the taxonomy of the genus is disputed, the genus has been suggested as a biological control agent for Bryophyllum delagoense in Australia.

Taxonomy
The genus was first identified by the German entomologist Edgar von Harold in 1877 from species in Madagascar, Nyassa and Port Natal. By 1914, 18 different species had already been recorded  from  Madagascar. In 1965, Brian J. Selman reduced the size of the genus by 45 species, transferring them to other genera such as Paraivongius, Massartia and Sarum. He also suggested that a revision of the Eumolpinae of Madagascar would produce a complete generic separation of the Madagascan and African species.
In 2006, it was suggested that a full revision of the genus is necessary.

Species
Species from Africa:

 Rhembastus apicalis Pic, 1940
 Rhembastus apicicollis Burgeon, 1941
 Rhembastus atripennis Pic, 1939
 Rhembastus atriventris Pic, 1939
 Rhembastus benuensis Weise, 1907
 Rhembastus bipunctatus Selman, 1972
 Rhembastus brevicornis (Jacoby, 1904)
 Rhembastus collaris (Gerstaecker, 1871)
 Rhembastus crampeli Pic, 1952
 Rhembastus crassus Burgeon, 1941
 Rhembastus discoidalis Pic, 1939
 Rhembastus diversicolor Pic, 1939
 Rhembastus flavidus Lefèvre, 1890
 Rhembastus impressicostatus Pic, 1940
 Rhembastus laticollis Burgeon, 1942
 Rhembastus maculatus (Lefèvre, 1877)
 Rhembastus mandolloides Selman, 1972
 Rhembastus mechowi (Weise, 1883)
 Rhembastus melanostictus Fairmaire, 1886
 Rhembastus metalliconotatus Pic, 1939
 Rhembastus natalensis (Lefèvre, 1877)
 Rhembastus niger Burgeon, 1941
 Rhembastus perarmatus Burgeon, 1941
 Rhembastus piceus Zoia, 2017
 Rhembastus punctatosulcatus Fairmaire, 1887
 Rhembastus remaudierei Jolivet, 1953
 Rhembastus ruficolor Pic, 1941
 Rhembastus rufiventris Pic, 1953
 Rhembastus rufocinctus Pic, 1939
 Rhembastus rufofasciatus Pic, 1952
 Rhembastus rufohumeralis Pic, 1939
 Rhembastus semiviolaceus Pic, 1952
 Rhembastus simoni (Weise, 1883)
 Rhembastus striatipennis Lefèvre, 1891
 Rhembastus testaceoapicalis Pic, 1939
 Rhembastus usambaricus Weise, 1907
 Rhembastus variabilis Harold, 1877
 Rhembastus xanthocnemis Weise, 1907

Species from Madagascar:

 Rhembastus abbreviatus (Jacoby, 1897)
 Rhembastus ambohibyensis Bechyné, 1960
 Rhembastus ampanefenae Bechyné, 1953
 Rhembastus androyensis Bechyné, 1956
 Rhembastus antennatus Jacoby, 1892
 Rhembastus antsirabensis Bechyné, 1954
 Rhembastus apicicornis Jacoby, 1897
 Rhembastus asuefactus Bechyné, 1950
 Rhembastus atomarius (Lefèvre, 1877)
 Rhembastus attelaboides (Fairmaire, 1886)
 Rhembastus augur Bechyné, 1947
 Rhembastus caeruleipennis Jacoby, 1901
 Rhembastus centralis Bechyné, 1956
 Rhembastus chatanayi Bechyné, 1960
 Rhembastus circumductus Bechyné, 1953
 Rhembastus colasi Bechyné, 1956
 Rhembastus congener Bechyné, 1946
 Rhembastus coquillati Bechyné, 1947
 Rhembastus costulifer Bechyné, 1947
 Rhembastus dimidiaticornis Jacoby, 1892
 Rhembastus dissutus Bechyné, 1951
 Rhembastus felicitarius Bechyné, 1956
 Rhembastus flavotibialis Bechyné, 1946
 Rhembastus fulvipennis (Duvivier, 1891)
 Rhembastus geniculatus Harold, 1877
 Rhembastus gibbifer Bechyné, 1956
 Rhembastus gracilipes Bechyné, 1960
 Rhembastus hereditarius Bechyné, 1947
 Rhembastus hoberlandti Bechyné, 1946
 Rhembastus hovus Bechyné, 1946
 Rhembastus humerosus Weise, 1910
 Rhembastus imitans Jacoby, 1897
 Rhembastus jacobyi Weise, 1910
 Rhembastus janthinipennis (Fairmaire, 1869)
 Rhembastus jeanneli Bechyné, 1946
 Rhembastus joliveti Bechyné, 1946
 Rhembastus lambertoni Bechyné, 1946
 Rhembastus lebisi Bechyné, 1946
 Rhembastus lepidus Weise, 1910
 Rhembastus madagascariensis (Lefèvre, 1877)
 Rhembastus mandritsarensis Bechyné, 1951
 Rhembastus mandritsarensis contrarius Bechyné, 1951
 Rhembastus mandritsarensis mandritsarensis Bechyné, 1951
 Rhembastus manjakatompensis Bechyné, 1964
 Rhembastus micheli Bechyné, 1947
 Rhembastus multatitius Bechyné, 1964
 Rhembastus nanulus Harold, 1877
 Rhembastus nanulus comorensis Bechyné, 1964
 Rhembastus nanulus fallaciosissimus Bechyné, 1949
 Rhembastus nanulus insularis (Maulik, 1931)
 Rhembastus nanulus nanulus Harold, 1877
 Rhembastus nanulus nossibeanus Bechyné, 1964
 Rhembastus nickerli Bechyné, 1946
 Rhembastus nigromaculatus (Jacoby, 1892)
 Rhembastus nubilus Harold, 1877
 Rhembastus octomaculatus (Weise, 1910)
 Rhembastus pan Bechyné, 1947
 Rhembastus parioides Bechyné, 1947
 Rhembastus pauliani Bechyné, 1960
 Rhembastus pectoralis Bechyné, 1946
 Rhembastus pensistus Bechyné, 1947
 Rhembastus perinetensis Bechyné, 1960
 Rhembastus persimilis Bechyné, 1946
 Rhembastus persimplex Weise, 1910
 Rhembastus pusillus Harold, 1877
 Rhembastus quadriplagiatus Bechyné, 1947
 Rhembastus sambiranensis Bechyné, 1964
 Rhembastus schaeferi Bechyné, 1947
 Rhembastus seguyi Bechyné, 1960
 Rhembastus selectus Bechyné, 1946
 Rhembastus solicitarius Bechyné, 1964
 Rhembastus stilpnus Bechyné, 1947
 Rhembastus subangulatus Bechyné, 1947
 Rhembastus tananarivensis Bechyné, 1946
 Rhembastus tantillus (Lefèvre, 1877)
 Rhembastus tener Bechyné, 1960
 Rhembastus tibialis (Lefèvre, 1877)
 Rhembastus tonsilis Bechyné, 1951
 Rhembastus tricolor Bechyné, 1946
 Rhembastus unicostulatus Bechyné, 1947

Species moved to Paraivongius:
 Rhembastus inapicalis Pic, 1940

References

External links
List of Rhembastus species

Chrysomelidae genera
Eumolpinae
Beetles of Africa
Taxa named by Edgar von Harold